Aristotelia psoraleae is a moth of the family Gelechiidae. It was described by Annette Frances Braun in 1930. It is found in North America, where it has been recorded from California, Kentucky, Montana and Ohio.

References

Moths described in 1930
Aristotelia (moth)
Moths of North America